The Niue Island Sports Association is an unrecognized National Olympic Committee and associate member of the Oceania National Olympic Committees. The organization is the national federation for all sports within Niue and represents the country at the Commonwealth Games, making its debut at the Manchester 2002. The association also organises the country's participation in the Commonwealth Youth Games. It is a signatory to the World Anti-Doping Agency.

During the 2015 Pacific Games, the nation won a silver medal at the Female Lawn Bowls event and Individual BodyBuilding +100kg Male event.

See also 
 Niue at the Commonwealth Games
 Niue Athletics Association

References

External links 
 
 Page at Oceaniasport.com
 Former website (archived)

Niue
Sport in Niue